Vanessa Gladone (born June 3   1982 at Schœlcher) is a former French athlete, who specialized in the triple jump and Long jump.

Biography  
In 2009, she won French national championships in the triple jump and Long jump.

She was also an accomplished High Jump athlete with a best of 1.83m in 2009

and her best performance in the  Heptathlon was 5622 points

Retired from track since 2012, she  now hosts on TV.

prize list  
 French Championships in Athletics   :  
 winner of the triple jump 2009   
 winner of the long jump 2009   
 French Indoors Athletics Championships:  
 winner of the long jump 2010

Records

Notes and references

External links  
  Biography of Vanessa Gladone on the French Athletics Federation website 
 

1982 births
Living people
French female long jumpers
French female triple jumpers
French female high jumpers
French heptathletes
Heptathletes